Charles Thomas Munger (born January 1, 1924) is an American billionaire investor, businessman, and former real estate attorney. He is vice chairman of Berkshire Hathaway, the conglomerate controlled by Warren Buffett; Buffett has described Munger as his closest partner and right-hand man. Munger served as chairman of Wesco Financial Corporation from 1984 through 2011. He is also chairman of the Daily Journal Corporation, based in Los Angeles, California, and a director of Costco Wholesale Corporation.

Early life and education
Munger was born in Omaha, Nebraska. As a teenager, he worked at Buffett & Son, a grocery store owned by Warren Buffett's grandfather, Ernest P. Buffett. His father, Alfred Case Munger, was a lawyer. His grandfather was Thomas Charles Munger, a U.S. district court judge and state representative.

He enrolled in the University of Michigan, where he studied mathematics. During his time in college, he joined the fraternity Sigma Phi Society. In early 1943, a few days after his 19th birthday, he dropped out of college to serve in the U.S. Army Air Corps, where he became a second lieutenant. After receiving a high score on the Army General Classification Test, he was ordered to study meteorology at Caltech in Pasadena, California, the town he was to make his home.

Through the GI Bill Munger took a number of advanced courses through several universities. When he applied to his father's alma mater, Harvard Law School, the dean of admissions rejected him because Munger had not completed an undergraduate degree. However, the dean relented after a call from Roscoe Pound, the former dean of Harvard Law and a Munger family friend. Munger excelled in law school, graduating magna cum laude with a J.D. in 1948. At Harvard, he was a member of the Harvard Legal Aid Bureau.

In college and the Army, he developed "an important skill": card playing. He used this in his approach to business. "What you have to learn is to fold early when the odds are against you, or if you have a big edge, back it heavily because you don't get a big edge often. Opportunity comes, but it doesn't come often, so seize it when it does come." He also used a card analogy to explain an approach to stock trading. He maintained that treating the shares of a company like baseball cards is a losing strategy because it requires one to predict the behavior of often irrational and emotional human beings.

Investment career
Munger moved with his family to California, where he joined the law firm Wright & Garrett (later Musick, Peeler & Garrett). In 1962, he founded and worked as a real estate attorney at Munger, Tolles & Olson LLP. He then gave up the practice of law to concentrate on managing investments and later partnered with Otis Booth in real estate development. He then partnered with Jack Wheeler to form Wheeler, Munger, and Company, an investment firm with a seat on the Pacific Coast Stock Exchange. He wound up Wheeler, Munger, and Co. in 1976, after losses of 32% in 1973 and 31% in 1974.

Although Munger is better known for his association with Buffett, he ran an investment partnership of his own from 1962 to 1975. According to Buffett's essay "The Superinvestors of Graham-and-Doddsville", published in 1984, Munger's investment partnership generated compound annual returns of 19.8% during the 1962–75 period compared to a 5.0% annual appreciation rate for the Dow.

Munger was previously the chairman of Wesco Financial Corporation, now a wholly-owned subsidiary of Berkshire Hathaway. The acquisition of this company was controversial following accusations that Buffett's company, Blue Chip bought Wesco shares to defeat an impending merger between Wesco and Financial Corp. Wesco began as a savings and loan association, but eventually grew to control Precision Steel Corp., CORT Furniture Leasing, Kansas Bankers Surety Company, and other ventures. Wesco Financial also held a concentrated equity portfolio of over US$1.5 billion in companies such as Coca-Cola, Wells Fargo, Procter & Gamble, Kraft Foods, US Bancorp, and Goldman Sachs. Munger believes that holding a concentrated number of stocks that he knows extremely well will in the long term produce superior returns.

Wesco is based in Pasadena, California, Munger's adopted hometown. Pasadena was also the site of the company's annual shareholders' meeting, which were typically held on the Wednesday or Thursday after the more famous Berkshire Hathaway annual meeting. Munger's meetings were nearly as legendary in the investment community as those he co-hosts with Buffett in Omaha. Such meetings were often perfunctory, but Munger interacted with the other Wesco shareholders at considerable length, sometimes speculating about what Benjamin Franklin would do in a given situation. Meeting notes have been posted on the Futile Finance? website, but no updates exist beyond 2011.

Munger is also the chairman of the Daily Journal Corporation. Since Wesco meetings ended, the Daily Journal annual meeting has grown in importance, as investors flock to the meeting to listen to him speak at length.

Investment philosophy

"Elementary, worldly wisdom"

In multiple speeches, and in the book Poor Charlie's Almanack: The Wit and Wisdom of Charles T. Munger, "worldly wisdom" consists of a set of mental models framed as a latticework to help solve critical business problems.

Munger, along with Buffett, is one of the main inspirations behind the book Seeking Wisdom: From Darwin to Munger. Author Peter Bevelin explained his key learnings from both Munger and Buffett in a 2007 interview: "How to think about businesses and investing, how to behave in life, the importance of ethics and honesty, how to approach problems but foremost how to reduce the chance of meeting problems." Bevelin stated that previously, he "was lacking the Munger ability to un-learn my own best-loved ideas".

Munger states that high ethical standards are integral to his philosophy; at the 2009 Wesco Financial Corporation annual meeting he said, "Good businesses are ethical businesses. A business model that relies on trickery is doomed to fail." During an interview and Q&A session at Harvard-Westlake School on January 19, 2010, Munger referred to American philosopher Charles Frankel in his discussion on the financial crisis of 2007–08 and the philosophy of responsibility. Munger explained that Frankel believed:

the system is responsible in proportion to the degree that the people who make the decisions bear the consequences. So to Charlie Frankel, you don't create a loan system where all the people who make the loans promptly dump them on somebody else through lies and twaddle, and they don't bear the responsibility when the loans are good or bad. To Frankel, that is amoral, that is an irresponsible system.

Lollapalooza effect

Munger uses the term "Lollapalooza effect" for multiple biases, tendencies or mental models acting in compound with each other at the same time in the same direction. With the Lollapalooza effect, itself a mental model, the result is often extreme, due to the confluence of the mental models, biases or tendencies acting together, greatly increasing the likelihood of acting irrationally.

During a talk at Harvard in 1995 titled The Psychology of Human Misjudgment, Munger mentions Tupperware parties and open outcry auctions, where he explained "three, four, five of these things work together and it turns human brains into mush," meaning that normal people will be highly likely to succumb to the multiple irrational tendencies acting in the same direction. In the Tupperware party, you have reciprocation, consistency and commitment tendency, and social proof. (The hostess gave the party and the tendency is to reciprocate; you say you like certain products during the party so purchasing would be consistent with views you've committed to; other people are buying, which is the social proof.) 
In the open outcry auction, there is social proof of others bidding, reciprocation tendency, commitment to buying the item, and deprivation super-reaction syndrome, i.e. sense of loss. The latter is an individual's sense of loss of what he or she believes should be (or is) his or hers. These biases often occur at either conscious or subconscious level, and in both microeconomic and macroeconomic scale.

Principle of inversion
Munger is famous for his quote "All I want to know is where I'm going to die, so I'll never go there." This thinking was inspired by the German mathematician Carl Jacobi who often solved difficult problems by following a simple strategy: man muss immer umkehren (or loosely translated, "invert, always invert.")

"[Jacobi] knew that it is in the nature of things that many hard problems are best solved when they are addressed backward," Munger counsels. "Indeed, many problems can't be solved forward."

Criticism of cryptocurrencies and Robinhood
Munger is critical of cryptocurrencies, referring to Bitcoin in particular as "noxious poison." Munger also compared Robinhood to gambling, saying that its success is due to "people who know how to take advantage essentially of the gambling instincts of, not only American public, worldwide public" and further explained why he thinks individual investments without commission is tantamount to gambling. "If you cater to those gambling chips, when people have money in their pocket for the first time, and you tell them they can make 30 or 40 or 50 trades a day, and you're not charging them any commission, but you're selling their order flow or whatever, I hope we don't have more of it." He has also said the use of cryptocurrency should be banned and said it was "beneath contempt"; that bitcoin was "stupid, "immoral," and "disgusting" and that It's like somebody else is trading turds and you decide, 'I can't be left out; and that it was like a venereal disease, among other things.

Wealth and philanthropy
As of January 2021, Munger has an estimated net worth of $1.9 billion according to Forbes.

Munger is a major benefactor of the University of Michigan. In 2007, Munger made a $3 million gift to the University of Michigan Law School for lighting improvements in Hutchins Hall and the William W. Cook Legal Research Building, including the noted Reading Room. In 2011, Munger made another gift to the Law School, contributing $20 million for renovations to the Lawyers Club housing complex, which will cover the majority of the $39 million cost. The renovated portion of the Lawyers Club will be renamed the Charles T. Munger Residences in the Lawyers Club in his honor.

In 1997, the Mungers donated $1.8 million to the Marlborough School in Los Angeles, of which Nancy Munger was an alumna. The couple also donated to the Polytechnic School in Pasadena and the Los Angeles YMCA.

On December 28, 2011, Munger donated 10 shares of Berkshire Hathaway Class A stock (currently valued at $481,021 per share, or $4.81 million total) to the University of Michigan.

Munger and his late wife Nancy B. Munger have been major benefactors of Stanford University. Nancy Munger was an alumna of Stanford, and Wendy Munger, Charlie Munger's daughter from a previous marriage, was also an alumna (A.B. 1972). Both Nancy and Wendy Munger served as members of the Stanford board of trustees. In 2004, the Mungers donated 500 shares of Berkshire Hathaway Class A stock, then valued at $43.5 million, to Stanford to build a graduate student housing complex.

Munger has not signed The Giving Pledge that was started by his partner Warren Buffett and co-director, Bill Gates, and has stated that he "can't do it" because "[he has] already transferred so much to [his] children that [he has] already violated it."

Architectural efforts and controversy

Though Munger has no formal architectural training, he has contributed heavily to numerous building designs, including dormitories at Stanford University and the University of Michigan, as well as his current home. He has donated to universities on the precondition that the universities follow his architectural blueprints exactly. In each case, Munger promotes key architectural concepts of his own liking, and cedes professional architectural responsibility to a licensed architect of record, e.g., Hartman-Cox Architects in the case of the dormitory at UMichigan, and the firm of VTBS for the U.C. Santa Barbara residence hall.

On April 18, 2013, the University of Michigan announced the single largest gift in its history: a $110 million gift from Munger to fund a new "state of the art" residence designed to foster a community of scholars, where graduate students from multiple disciplines can live and exchange ideas. The gift includes $10 million for graduate student fellowships. Munger designed the residence, which houses 600 single bedrooms, most of which are designed to be windowless.

The Munger Graduate Residence, funded and designed by Munger himself, opened in late 2009 and now houses 600 law and graduate students. The Munger family gave a major gift to Stanford's Green Library to fund the restoration of the Bing Wing as well as the construction of a rotunda on the library's second floor, and endowed the Munger Chair in Nancy and Charles Munger Professorship of Business at Stanford Law School.

Munger has been a trustee of the Harvard-Westlake School in Los Angeles for more than 40 years, and previously served as chair of the board of trustees. His five sons and stepsons as well as at least one grandson graduated from the prep school. In 2009, Munger donated eight shares of Berkshire Hathaway Class A stock, worth nearly $800,000, to Harvard-Westlake. In 2006, Munger donated 100 shares of Berkshire Hathaway Class A stock, then valued at $9.2 million, to the school toward a building campaign at Harvard-Westlake's middle school campus. The Mungers had previously made a gift to build the $13 million Munger Science Center at the high school campus, a two-story classroom and laboratory building which opened in 1995 and has been described as "a science teacher's dream". The design of the Science Center was substantially influenced by Munger.

In October 2014, Munger announced that he would donate $65 million to the Kavli Institute for Theoretical Physics at the University of California, Santa Barbara. This is the largest gift in the history of the school. The donation went toward construction of a residence building designed by Munger for visitors of the Kavli Institute in an effort to bring together physicists to exchange ideas as Munger stated,"to talk to one another, create new stuff, cross-fertilize ideas".

In March 2016, Munger announced a further $200 million gift to UC Santa Barbara, conditioned on the university's commitment to spend it on an undergraduate dormitory of Munger's own unconventional design preferences, notably windowless bedrooms and common areas, while tripling the record gift he gave for the Kavli Institute for Theoretical Physics.  In October, 2021, Munger's insistence that the university follow his design compelled professional architect, Dennis McFadden, who had served the university for two decades, to resign from the university's Design Review Committee. McFadden stated that the windowless, 1.68-million-square-foot dormitory would be unsupportable from my perspective as an architect, a parent, and a human being ...  An ample body of documented evidence shows that interior environments with access to natural light, air, and views to nature improve both the physical and mental wellbeing of occupants ...  The Munger Hall design ignores this evidence and seems to take the position that it doesn't matter ...  [T]he building is a social and psychological experiment with an unknown impact on the lives and personal development of the undergraduates the university serves."

Personal life
In 1945, while studying at Caltech, Munger married Nancy Huggins, daughter of Frederick R. Huggins and Edith M. Huggins. She was a Pasadena native who had been Munger's sister's roommate at Scripps College.
They had three children, Wendy Munger (a former corporate lawyer, trustee of Stanford University, and trustee of The Huntington Library), Molly Munger (a civil rights attorney and funder of a ballot initiative to raise California taxes for public education) and Teddy Munger (deceased, leukemia, age 9).

After Munger's divorce, he remarried within a couple of years. From his second marriage with Nancy Barry, daughter of David Noble Barry Jr. and Emilie Hevener Barry, he has four children—physicist and Republican activist Charles T. Munger Jr., Emilie Munger Ogden, Barry A. Munger and Philip R. Munger—and two stepchildren: William Harold Borthwick and David Borthwick.

On July 22, 2002, Munger's first wife Nancy Huggins Freeman died of cancer at age 76.

On February 6, 2010, Munger's second wife Nancy Barry Munger died at home at age 86.

Munger is a Republican and has provided his opinions on a number of political topics including the policies of the Trump administration. Munger states he is "not a normal Republican", for example advocating "medicare for all" as a fix to the U.S. healthcare system, saying "I think we should have 
single-payer medicine eventually". Munger repeated his sentiments in another interview, praising Singapore's single payer system in contrast to the U.S. "insane" system which is a "national disgrace".

In his 50s, after a failed eye cataract surgery that rendered his left eye blind, Munger had his left eye removed due to severe pain. When doctors told him that he had developed a condition that may cause his remaining eye to fill up with blood and become blind too, Munger started taking braille lessons. The eye condition has since receded and he still has sight in his right eye.

Citations

General and cited sources 
 Bevelin, Peter (2007). Seeking Wisdom: From Darwin to Munger
 Griffin, Tren (2015). Charlie Munger: The Complete Investor.
 Kaufman, Peter (2005, 2006 for the second edition and 2008 for the third edition). Poor Charlie's Almanack: The Wit and Wisdom of Charles T. Munger 
 Labitan, Bud (2008). The Four Filters Invention of Warren Buffett and Charlie Munger, Acalmix
 
 Lowe, Janet (2000). Damn Right! Behind the Scenes with Berkshire Hathaway Billionaire Charlie Munger, John Wiley & Sons

Further reading

External links

 Charlie Munger Link Collection

1924 births
American billionaires
American businesspeople in insurance
American chief executives of financial services companies
American financial analysts
American financial company founders
American financiers
American investors
American money managers
American philanthropists
American stock traders
Berkshire Hathaway employees
Businesspeople from Omaha, Nebraska
California Institute of Technology alumni
California Republicans
Directors of Berkshire Hathaway
Harvard Law School alumni
Living people
Nebraska lawyers
People associated with Munger, Tolles & Olson
United States Army Air Forces officers
United States Army Air Forces personnel of World War II
University of Michigan College of Literature, Science, and the Arts alumni